Asura ( Demon) is a 2015 Telugu language film, the first directed by Krishna Vijay. It was produced by Shyam Devabhaktuni and Krishna Vijay, and stars Nara Rohit and Priya Banerjee. It received a positive reception and was declared a box office hit.

Plot

Dharma Teja is a jailor at Rajahmundry Central Jail who is strict and sincere but also sensitive and kindhearted. In his department, people call him a demon because of his anger and strictness. His aim is to become a poet, which he is working on in his free time. Dharma has different thoughts on the reformation of prisoners and does not mind breaking the law to do good for others. One day, Chandrashekar aka Charlie, a former diamond merchant, is sentenced to death on charges of killing his stepmother's siblings for the sake of their property. In jail, Charlie meets a thief called Pandu.

Pandu is vengeful against Charlie because he once tried to steal diamonds from Charlie, and when Charlie caught him, he made him handicapped and sent him to jail. After hearing the news through his girlfriend Saira, Charlie decides to escape from jail. Then, he makes a deal with Pandu to give half the diamonds, which once he had tried to steal two diamonds from him for escaping of him from jail, which was worthy of 50o million. Pandu forgets his enmity with Charlie and accepts his offer. Then, Charlie arranges bail to Pandu. He meets gangsters Muthyammanna and his brother Daya and tells his offer to help, then they make a plan to escape Charlie from prison. Meanwhile, Charlie was survived temporarily from hanging through a drug and fell asleep.

In the investigation, Dharma knows that Saira supplied the drug through a sweets box during the visiting hours. He arrested Saira and threatened her to tell Charlie's further plans. Saira tells everything she knows to Dharma, then they tried to implement the death punishment again to Charlie. Meanwhile, Daya and his gang kidnap a magistrate's son who is approving Charlie's death, the mother of the hangman who executes Charlie, and Dharma's girlfriend Harika. They call unknowns to each other and blackmail them into helping in Charlie's escape. Dharma takes it as a challenge to save his girlfriend and execute Charlie. Meanwhile, in the execution room, the hangman saves Charlie, creating a technical problem in the executing mission, then the higher officials take a severe action against Dharma. In the investigation, he discovers Charlie and Pandu's meeting. In the searching of Pandu, he successfully went to his hideout. In a rough chase, Daya killed Pandu and was transferred to the commissioner's office on charges of duty negligence. The commissioner takes it as a challenge and transfers Charlie to the special jail for hanging under his control. Taking it as an advantage, Muthyammanna and Daya attack on the police and successfully have Charlie escape. Suddenly, Dharma enters and attacks them. While in a shootout, Charlie injures Daya, and then Dharma kills Daya. After that, the police alerts the public on Charlie's escape and announces a ransom on him.

Dharma successfully protects Harika, the hangman's mother, and the magistrate's son. Then, the human rights commission gives a severe charge on Dharma and suspends him for a temporary period, while the human rights investigation continues. After a few days, Dharma goes to a secret hideout to meet a wounded Muthyammanna and says that actually, Charlie was dead earlier after kidnapping Harika. The hangman and magistrate inform him that their family members were also kidnapped. Then he makes a plan to save them from the evil clutches, so he said that Charlie was alive because of a technical issue in the mission and arranged a former criminal to act as Charlie. The plan was successful when the people were attacked on the police. Dharma then tells his previous conversation with Charlie. After knowing Charlie's plans through Saira, Dharma meets Charlie in the meeting. Charlie confesses to Dharma that nobody cannot stop him from escaping. He makes a deal with Pandu for giving diamonds, then Dharma asks, "If you may be cheated by them, then what will you do?" Charlie replies by saying he cannot be cheated by anyone because the diamonds were in a safe which can be opened through his fingerprint, which was located in a secret place.

After Charlie's death, the hangman cuts Charlie's hand. Dharma finds out the place through Saira, possesses Charlie's diamonds, and sends the diamonds secretly to Charlie's stepmother. He reveals the entire story and keeps it as a secret. The diamonds will be used for a good purpose, which an NGO is going to launched by Charlie's stepmother. After hearing this, Muthyammanna dies. With Harika's help, Dharma finishes his poetry work successfully; at the same time, he gets a call from his higher officials to rejoining in the service as a jailor. Harika asks Dharma what he will name his book, to which Dharma decides "Asura", because his department calls him like that, so he named the book with an inspiration of that nature.

Cast

Soundtrack
The music was composed by Sai Karthik and released by Lahari Music.

Release 
The Central Board of Film Certification rated the film U/A.

Critical reception 
Idlebrain rated Asura 3/5 and called it a different attempt which would be liked by people who like films of different genres. 123 Telugu rated it 3.25/5 and stated, "With Asura, Nara Rohit once again proves his taste for different cinema and brings us a gripping thriller... Asura will be a very unique and interesting experience for all those who like watching intense thrillers".

References

External links 
 

2015 directorial debut films
2015 films
Films shot in Telangana
Fictional portrayals of the Telangana Police
2010s Telugu-language films
2015 action thriller films
Indian action thriller films
Films scored by Sai Karthik